Ian Richard Smith (born 16 March 1965) is a former Scotland international rugby union player. He is now a rugby union coach.

Rugby Union career

Amateur career

He was educated at the Sir Thomas Rich's School in Longlevens. He went on to play for Gloucester. He formerly played as a flanker. Smith made his senior debut aged 18 and by 1996 had played more than 350 games for them.

Provincial career

He played for the Scottish Exiles district in the Scottish Inter-District Championship. Smith stated: "I always wanted to play for Scotland, from the days of watching the Five Nations sat on my grandfather’s knee."

International career

He represented England 'B' against Spain in 1989. He also qualified for Scotland through his paternal grandparents and Ian McGeechan persuaded him to play for Scotland.

He played for Scotland 'B' against Ireland 'B' on 22 December 1990.

In 1991 he played for Scotland 7s in the Hong Kong Sevens tournament.

He made his full test debut for Scotland against England at Murrayfield on 18 January 1992. He played one match at the 1995 World Cup. His last international appearance was against South Africa at Murrayfield on 6 December 1997. He gained 25 caps for Scotland in the period 1992–97.

He played 7 matches for the Barbarian F.C. and scored 9 points between 1990 and 1993. He captained the team against Newport in 1992.

Coaching career

In 2004 returned to Moseley as head coach. In 2009 Mosely beat Leeds at Twickenham to win the EDF Energy National Trophy.

In 2011 he went on to a coaching role with the Georgia national rugby union team. He was appointed interim and later effective head coach of Portugal going into the World Rugby Nations Cup in 2016.

Outside of rugby union

He worked as a civil engineer.

References

External links
 profile on ESPN

1965 births
Living people
People from Gloucester
People educated at Sir Thomas Rich's School
Scotland international rugby union players
Scotland 'A' international rugby union players
Scotland international rugby sevens players
Scottish rugby union coaches
Barbarian F.C. players
Rugby union flankers
Male rugby sevens players
Scotland 'B' international rugby union players
Scottish Exiles (rugby union) players